MeshLab is a 3D mesh processing software system that is oriented to the management and processing of unstructured large meshes and provides a set of tools for editing, cleaning, healing, inspecting, rendering, and converting these kinds of meshes. MeshLab is free and open-source software, subject to the requirements of the GNU General Public License (GPL), version 2 or later, and is used as both a complete package and a library powering other software. It is well known in the more technical fields of 3D development and data handling.

Overview

MeshLab is developed by the ISTI - CNR research center; initially MeshLab was created as a course assignment at the University of Pisa in late 2005. It is a general-purpose system aimed at the processing of the typical not-so-small unstructured 3D models that arise in the 3D scanning pipeline.

The automatic mesh cleaning filters includes removal of duplicated, unreferenced vertices, non-manifold edges, vertices, and null faces. Remeshing tools support high quality simplification based on quadric error measure, various kinds of subdivision surfaces, and two surface reconstruction algorithms from point clouds based on the ball-pivoting technique and on the Poisson surface reconstruction approach. For the removal of noise, usually present in acquired surfaces, MeshLab supports various kinds of smoothing filters and tools for curvature analysis and visualization.

It includes a tool for the registration of multiple range maps based on the iterative closest point algorithm. MeshLab also includes an interactive direct paint-on-mesh system that allows users to interactively change the color of a mesh, to define selections and to directly smooth out noise and small features.

MeshLab is available for most platforms, including Linux, Mac OS X, Windows and, with reduced functionality, on Android and iOS and even as a pure client-side JavaScript application called MeshLabJS. The system supports input/output in the following formats: PLY, STL, OFF, OBJ, 3DS, VRML 2.0, X3D and COLLADA. MeshLab can also import point clouds reconstructed using Photosynth.

MeshLab is used in various academic and research contexts, like microbiology, cultural heritage, surface reconstruction, paleontology, for rapid prototyping in orthopedic surgery, in orthodontics, and desktop manufacturing.

Additional images

See also 

Geometry processing
3D scanner
List of free and open-source software packages

References

External links 
 Github repository for Meshlab
MeshLabJS homepage of the experimental, client based, JavaScript, version of MeshLab that runs inside a browser. 
MeshLab Stuff Blog Development blog, with tutorials and example of use of MeshLab.
MeshLab for iOS page dedicated to the iPad and iPhone version of MeshLab.
MeshLab for Android page dedicated to the Android version of MeshLab

2005 software
3D graphics software
3D graphics software that uses Qt
3D modeling software for Linux
Computer-aided design software
Computer-aided design software for Linux
Free 3D graphics software
Free computer-aided design software
Free graphics software
Free software programmed in C++
Video game development software